Third degree may refer to:

General 

 "The third degree", a colloquial expression for torture or intensive interrogation

Arts, entertainment, and media

Film
 The Third Degree (1913 film), American silent melodrama
 The Third Degree (1919 film), American silent drama
 The Third Degree (1926 film), American romance film
 The Third Degree (2001 film), American crime television film by Steve Miner
 Third Degree Films, American pornographic film studio

Literature
3rd Degree (novel), 2004, by James Patterson
 Third Degree, a book by Tania Roxborogh

Music
Third Degree, a 1986 Johnny Winter album
 Third Degree (Flying Colors album), a 2019 Flying Colors album
Third Degree (styled "THIRD D3GREE"), predecessor to Australian pop duo The Clique

Television and radio
3rd Degree (game show), an American TV show
3rd Degree, a South African current affairs TV show on eNCA
The 3rd Degree (radio series), a BBC Radio 4 quiz show

Ranks
Third degree, a level of black belt in martial arts
Third degree or Master Mason, a rank of Freemasonry
Third degree, the highest rank in British Traditional Wicca

Other
 "Third Degree" - Funhouse franchise in the early 1900s

See also
 First degree (disambiguation)
 Second degree (disambiguation)
 The Three Degrees, an R&B vocal group